Dia Saba (sometimes Sabi'a or Seba, ; born 18 November 1992) is an Israeli professional footballer who plays as an attacking midfielder for Israeli Premier League club Maccabi Haifa.

Early life
Saba was born in Majd al-Krum, Israel, to a Muslim-Arab family. He is a cousin of former footballer Ahmad Saba'a.

Career
Saba began his career with the youth selections of Hapoel Haifa, and later moved to Beitar Nes Tubruk. In summer 2011, Saba joined Maccabi Tel Aviv and played under manager Motti Ivanir. However, he made only two appearances over four months, and in January 2012 was subsequently loaned to Hapoel Be'er Sheva until the end of the season. On 21 January 2012, Saba made his debut for Hapoel Be'er Sheva, and scored twice in a 2–0 victory over Hapoel Haifa, helping the club to stay in the league. He was then again loaned for half the season. In February 2013 he moved to Bnei Sakhnin, playing ten league matches and failing to score. Before the 2013–14 season, Saba signed with Maccabi Petah Tikva. The following season he signed a two-year contract with Maccabi Netanya. He played with Netanya for four years, scoring 51 goals in 114 appearances in all club competitions, including 24 league goals in the 2017–18 season.

On 17 September 2018, Saba returned to Be'er Sheva as Hapoel paid Maccabi Netanya a record transfer fee of €2 million. He signed a four-year contract with Be'er Sheva worth €1.6 million. He made his debut at home against Bnei Yehuda, in a goalless game. Saba scored his first goal for Be'er Sheva on 6 October 2018, in a 4–1 win over Maccabi Petah Tikva.

In January 2019, he moved to Chinese Super League side Guangzhou R&F, linking up with fellow Israel national team striker Eran Zahavi.

In September 2020, Saba joined Al-Nasr, becoming the first Israeli to play in the United Arab Emirates following the Israel–United Arab Emirates normalization agreement.

On 22 August 2022, Saba joined Turkish Süper Lig club Sivasspor.

On 30 January 2023, Saba signed a three-and-a-half year contract with Maccabi Haifa.

Career statistics

Club

International
Scores and results list Israel's goal tally first, score column indicates score after each Saba goal.

Honours
Maccabi Netanya
 Liga Leumit: 2016–17

Individual
 Israel Football Players Organization's Player of the Season: 2017–18
 Israeli Premier League top scorer: 2017–18 (24 goals)

References

External links

Living people
1992 births
Arab citizens of Israel
Arab-Israeli footballers
Israeli Muslims
Footballers from Majd al-Krum
Israeli footballers
Association football midfielders
Israel youth international footballers
Israel under-21 international footballers
Israel international footballers
Beitar Nes Tubruk F.C. players
Maccabi Netanya F.C. players
Maccabi Tel Aviv F.C. players
Hapoel Be'er Sheva F.C. players
Bnei Sakhnin F.C. players
Maccabi Petah Tikva F.C. players
Guangzhou City F.C. players
Al-Nasr SC (Dubai) players
Sivasspor footballers
Maccabi Haifa F.C. players
Israeli Premier League players
Liga Leumit players
Chinese Super League players
UAE Pro League players
Süper Lig players
Israeli expatriate footballers
Expatriate footballers in China
Expatriate footballers in the United Arab Emirates
Expatriate footballers in Turkey
Israeli expatriate sportspeople in China
Israeli expatriate sportspeople in the United Arab Emirates
Israeli expatriate sportspeople in Turkey